Dillwynia Correctional Centre is a prison for women located on the grounds of the Francis Greenway Correctional Complex in Berkshire Park, a suburb of Sydney, Australia. The centre is operated by the Corrective Services division of the  New South Wales Department of Justice, and holds inmates sentenced under State or Australian criminal law.

The centre opened in 2003 and takes its name from Dillwynia, a genus of Australian flower, some species of which are native to Western Sydney.

Dillwynia accommodates both minimum- and medium-security inmates.

References

External links
 

Prisons in Sydney
2003 establishments in Australia
Women's prisons in Australia